Omnibus is an Italian breakfast television news and talk show, broadcast on La7 since 1998.

References

Telecom Italia Media
Italian television talk shows
Current affairs shows
2002 Italian television series debuts
2000s Italian television series
2010s Italian television series
La7 original programming